John MacFarlane (31 July 1813 – 6 July 1873) was a Scottish-born Australian physician and politician.

He was born in Glasgow and studied medicine at Glasgow University, qualifying in 1837. He worked as a ship's doctor until 1840, when he settled in Sydney and opened a practice. In 1847 he married Agnes Grace Johnstone. He was honorary physician at Sydney Infirmary from 1847 to 1869 and an examiner for the University of Sydney in 1856; he was also awarded an honorary degree from the University of Melbourne. In 1860 he was president of the Australian Medical Association. He was a member of the New South Wales Legislative Council from 1858 to 1861 and from 1861 to 1870.

References

1813 births
1873 deaths
Members of the New South Wales Legislative Council
19th-century Australian politicians